The John Cahill Medal, named after the Port Adelaide Football Club's ten time premiership coach and inaugural AFL coach John Cahill, is awarded to the club player adjudged best and fairest for the season. The voting system as of the 2017 AFL season, consists of each member of the coaching committee giving each player a ranking from zero to five after each match.

Recipients

|-
| 2022||style="text-align:left; background:#FFD700;"| ^#|| 
|}

Multiple winners

Notes
 The South Australian Football League was in recess from 1916–1918 due to World War I.
 The Port Adelaide Football Club did not participate in the 1942, 1943 and 1944 SANFL seasons because of World War II.

References
General

 

Specific

Australian Football League awards
Port Adelaide Football Club
Awards established in 1997
Australian rules football-related lists